The African Triathlon Championships is an African Triathlon competition event held every year, the event organised by the African Triathlon Union.

Winners' List

Ranking By Nations

References

External links 
African Triathlon Union

Triathlon
Recurring sporting events established in 1993